The Devil's Bait is an extant 1917 dramatic silent feature film starring Ruth Roland, an actress usually associated with serials. It was directed by Harry Harvey and produced by the Balboa Amusement Producing Company. General Film Company handled the distribution.

Future director Henry King, still an actor at this time, appears as a supporting player in the film.
This movie exists in the Library of Congress collection.

Cast
Ruth Roland - Doris Sheldon
William Conklin - Dr. Royal Sheldon
Ed Brady - Jason Davies(* billed Edwin J. Brady)
Henry King - Eric Reese
Lucy Blake - Madame De Long
Myrtle Reeves - Anita
Gordon Sackville -
Lucille Serwill -
Zada Marlo - 
Charles Dudley -

References

External links
The Devil's Bait @ IMDb.com
AllMovie.com

1917 films
American silent feature films
1917 drama films
American black-and-white films
Silent American drama films
1910s American films